Georg Wechter (1526 – 28 March 1586) was a German painter and engraver best known for his gold and silver designs.

In 1579 he produced his influential pattern book 30 Stück zum verzachnen für die Goldschmied verfertigt Geörg Wechter 15 Maller 79 Nürnberg (Nuremberg, 1579; e.g. Berlin, Kupferstichkab.), which provided 30 designs that any competent goldsmith could copy who could not produce his own.

References

External links 

1526 births
1586 deaths
German painters
German engravers
German goldsmiths